Edward Cyril Jones (11 March 1896 – 23 November 1978) was a Welsh cricketer.  Jones was a right-handed batsman whose bowling style is unknown.  He was born in Cardiff, Glamorgan.

After impressing in club cricket for Cardiff and Barry, Jones was called into Glamorgan's squad for their County Championship match against Leicestershire at Aylestone Road in 1926.  In his only first-class match, he wasn't called upon to bat or bowl.

Outside of cricket he worked as a police officer for South Wales Constabulary.  He died in Cardiff on 23 November 1978.

References

External links
Edward Jones at ESPNcricinfo
Edward Jones at CricketArchive

1896 births
1978 deaths
Cricketers from Cardiff
Welsh cricketers
Glamorgan cricketers
Welsh police officers
South Wales Police officers